Redcraze (born 1950) was a champion New Zealand Thoroughbred racehorse who raced both in Australia and New Zealand, winning major races in both countries.

A chestnut son of the Hyperion stallion Red Mars from the mare Myarion he is considered one of the finest horses not to win a Melbourne Cup, despite three attempts.

Often asked to carry big weights in handicap races his big frame and amazing recuperative powers saw him race until he was seven.

Originally trained by Syd Brown in New Zealand he was transferred to the stables of Tommy Smith in Australia as a late five-year-old.

It was in the care of Tommy Smith that he realised his huge potential.

Perhaps his greatest effort was when he ran second in the 1956 Melbourne Cup to the quality staying mare Evening Peal. As Redcraze usually raced at the tail of the field he produced a big finish, coming from the rear and just failing to win by a half-neck. What made the performance amazing is that he was carrying a handicap of  conceding  to the winner.

He was retired following an unplaced effort in the 1957 Melbourne Cup. His prize money at the time was an Australian record.

References

External links
 Redcraze's pedigree and partial racing stats

1950 racehorse births
Thoroughbred family 4-d
Cox Plate winners
Racehorses bred in New Zealand
Racehorses trained in New Zealand
Racehorses trained in Australia
Australian Racing Hall of Fame horses
Caulfield Cup winners